Euscepes is a genus of hidden snout weevils in the family Curculionidae. There are at least 20 described species in Euscepes.

Species
These 24 species belong to the genus Euscepes:

 Euscepes batatae Champion, 1905 c
 Euscepes bicolor Faust, 1896 c
 Euscepes carinirostris Hustache, 1930 c
 Euscepes convexipennis Hustache, 1930 c
 Euscepes crassirostris Chevrolat, 1879 c
 Euscepes deceptus Blatchley, 1925 i c
 Euscepes divisus Champion, 1905 c
 Euscepes erinaceus Chevrolat, 1880 c
 Euscepes fasciatus Faust, 1896 c
 Euscepes frontalis Chevrolat, 1879 c
 Euscepes fur Chevrolat, 1880 c
 Euscepes hirsutus Chevrolat, 1880 c
 Euscepes longisetis Champion, 1905 c
 Euscepes longulus Champion, 1905 c
 Euscepes obscurus Hustache, 1930 c
 Euscepes ornatipennis Chevrolat, 1879 c
 Euscepes parvulus Hustache, 1930 c
 Euscepes pilosellus Chevrolat, 1879 c
 Euscepes porcatus Chevrolat, 1879 c
 Euscepes porcellus Boheman, 1844 i c b
 Euscepes postfasciatus (Fairmaire, 1849) i c b (west Indian sweetpotato weevil)
 Euscepes tonsa Chevrolat, L.A.A., 1880 c
 Euscepes truncatipennis Champion, 1905 c
 Euscepes ursus Chevrolat, 1880 c

Data sources: i = ITIS, c = Catalogue of Life, g = GBIF, b = Bugguide.net

References

Further reading

 
 
 
 
 
 
 

Cryptorhynchinae
Articles created by Qbugbot
Taxa named by Carl Johan Schönherr
Taxa described in 1844